Doudian is a town situated in southeastern Fangshan District, Beijing, China. It shares border with Yancun and Liangxiang Towns in its north, Changyang Town in its east, Liulihe Town in its south, Shilou Town and Chengguan Subdistrict in its west. Its population was 96,184 according to the 2020 census. 

The town's name Doudian is a reference to Dou Jiande, a rebel leader who fought against the Sui dynasty and had once stationed his troops in the town.

History

Administrative Divisions 

As of 2021, Doudian was made up of 44 subdivisions, of which 14 were communities and 30 were villages:

See also 
 List of township-level divisions of Beijing

References 

Fangshan District
Towns in Beijing